Raffaele Rossi (28 October 1876 – 17 September 1948) - born Carlo - was an Italian cardinal of the Catholic Church and professed member from the Discalced Carmelites. Rossi served in the Sacred Consistorial Congregation in the Roman Curia from 1930 until his death and as a friar had the religious name "Raffaele of Saint Joseph". Pope Pius XI elevated him into the cardinalate in 1930.

Rossi also served as an investigator into the stigmata of Padre Pio at the behest of Pope Benedict XV and reported back to him with a favourable view on the Franciscan friar. He viewed the stigmata and spoke with the friar while noting that the friar was "sincere" and concluding that there was no fraud or deceit on the friar's part.

His cause of canonization began three decades after his death and he is known as a Servant of God.

Life

Education and priesthood
Carlo Rossi was born in Pisa in 1876 to Francesco Rossi and Maria Palmidessi. His parents were descended from noble families.

Rossi felt called in 1891 to enter the religious life despite the opposition of his father who instead enrolled Rossi for a philosophical course at the college in Pisa where one of his mentors was Giuseppe Toniolo.

Rossi entered the Discalced Carmelites on 3 October 1887 and later made his initial profession on 19 December 1899. His solemn profession of vows was made on 20 September 1901. He was ordained to the priesthood on 21 December 1901 in Pisa after he completed his ecclesial studies at the Carmelite International College and at the Carmelite Scholasticate in Rome. He then taught at Carmelite houses from 1902 until 1920 after having studied at the Pontifical Gregorian for further studies. One of his lecturers at the Gregorian was Cardinal Louis Billot and he made friends with Father Eugenio Pacelli - future pope. Rossi also served at some stage at the order's house of San Paolino in Florence.

Consecration
On 22 April 1920 he was appointed as the Bishop of Volterra and he received his episcopal consecration a month later from Cardinal Gaetano de Lai with Archbishop Rinaldo Rousset and Bishop Pio Bagnoli serving as the co-consecrators. It was celebrated in the church of Santa Teresa al Corso d'Italia. He selected Charles Borromeo as his model for his episcopate.

Padre Pio investigation
In 1921 he received a letter from Rome that commissioned him to conduct an investigation into the Franciscan friar Padre Pio and his stigmata. Rossi did not wish this task and sent a letter to Cardinal del Val asking to be relieved from such a serious investigation but was required to accept the position in response. Rossi travelled to Rome from his diocese to examine the documents on the friar while assessing the accusations and praise before leaving for the Franciscan convent at San Giovanni Rotondo that June with a degree of initial scepticism. He met with Padre Pio to discuss the allegations and reported that the friar seemed "simple and even nice" while being allowed to view the stigmata for himself. He observed Pio's routine and noted his activities while later speaking with the other friars to learn that Pio converted people from Judaism and Protestantism and converted hardened hearts from all across Europe. Rossi's investigation was positive and concluded that Pio was a "practiced practitioner of virtue" and noted that the friar did not practice deceit or fraud while noting that Pio did not inflict the wounds upon himself nor did an external source cause it. Rossi noted that "there are stigmata. We have before us a fact" and included that in his report to the pope while also stating that "Padre Pio was a saint who performed miracles" according to the people who came across him.

Episcopate and cardinalate
The pope named him as an Assistant at the Pontifical Throne on 11 March 1930. Before being promoted as the Titular Archbishop of Thessalonica on 20 December 1923 he was named as an assessor of the Sacred Consistorial Congregation. Pope Pius XI created him as the Cardinal-Priest of Santa Prassede on 30 June 1930 in advance of Rossi's appointment as the head of the Sacred Consistorial Congregation a month after. He received his red hat and title in the week following his elevation. In his position Rossi was the head of that congregation as the pope held the title of Prefect in its traditional sense. He was also one of the cardinal electors who participated in the 1939 papal conclave that selected Pope Pius XII. Rossi attempted to eschew much of the trappings of the cardinalate and attempted also to keep the ascetic life of a Discalced Carmelites and was held in high esteem by both his colleagues and the pope himself. Rossi later became the Superior General for the Scalabrini Fathers and became quite close to them in his work with them.

Death
His health began to decline at the start of 1947 and the papal doctor advised total rest.

Rossi died in Crespano del Grappa during the night on 17 September 1948 and was buried at the Santa Teresa al Corso d'Italia church. He was discovered dead in his bed (a slight smile on his face) with three books at his side: one was the Bible and another was The Imitation of Christ. He had moved to Crespano del Grappa the month prior due to failing health and resided with the Scalabrini Fathers. Pope Pius XII said that Rossi's contribution to the Church was great and would be recognized in the future. The pope also referred to Rossi as "almost their second father" in relation to the Scalabrini Fathers due to his great closeness and extensive work with them.

Beatification process
His cause of sainthood commenced on 23 April 1976 under Pope Paul VI and he was titled as a Servant of God. The diocesan process for the investigation was held in Rome and closed in 1979 before the Congregation for the Causes of Saints confirmed on 29 March 1985 that the process was valid. The Positio was submitted to the C.C.S. in 1989 for further evaluation and underwent theological approval on 23 February 1996.

One alleged miracle attributed to him was investigated in the Lucca diocese (it came from Capannori) from 1983 to 1984 and the process received C.C.S. validation on 6 May 1988.

References

External links
 The Cardinals of the Holy Roman Church
 Catholic Hierarchy
 Hagiography Circle

1876 births
1948 deaths
20th-century Italian cardinals
20th-century Italian Roman Catholic titular archbishops
20th-century venerated Christians
Bishops of Volterra
Carmelite bishops
Carmelite cardinals
Discalced Carmelites
Members of the Sacred Consistorial Congregation
Italian Servants of God
Venerated Carmelites
Clergy from Pisa
Pontifical Gregorian University alumni
University of Pisa alumni